Galaxy Edge may refer to:

Samsung Devices
Samsung Galaxy Note Edge, an Android phablet with a single curved edge
Samsung Galaxy S6 Edge, an Android smartphone with two curved edges
Samsung Galaxy S6 Edge+, an Android phablet with two curved edges
Samsung Galaxy S7 Edge, successor to the S6 Edge+

Other uses
Star Wars: Galaxy's Edge, a Star Wars-themed area at Disneyland and Disney's Hollywood Studios